Wichita is a major center of media in Kansas. The following is a list of media outlets based in the city.

Print

Magazines
Splurge!, monthly, local fashion and lifestyle
Teenview Magazine, monthly magazine created for teens by teens from a teens point of view.

Newspapers
The Wichita Eagle is the city's primary newspaper, published daily. Other newspapers published in the city include:

The Active Age, monthly, seniors' lifestyle
Catholic Advance, twice monthly, published by the Roman Catholic Diocese of Wichita
The Community Voice, bi-weekly, local African American news
Liberty Press, monthly, gay and lesbian lifestyle

The PlainDealer, monthly, labor news
The Sunflower, three days a week, Wichita State University student newspaper
The White Buffalo Gazette, monthly, American Indian news 
The Wichita Business Journal, weekly

Radio
Wichita, Kansas is the 98th largest radio market in the country as ranked by Arbitron. The following is a list of radio stations licensed to and/or broadcasting in the Wichita market. Unless otherwise noted, stations broadcast from studios in their city of license.

AM

FM

Television
Wichita is the principal city of the Wichita-Hutchinson, Kansas television market which consists of the western two-thirds of the state. According to Nielsen, it is the 67th largest market in the country. Cable television service for Wichita and the surrounding area is provided by Cox Communications and AT&T.

The following is a list of television stations that broadcast from and/or are licensed to the city. Unless otherwise noted, stations broadcast from studios in their city of license.

References

Wichita
Mass media in Kansas